I Hope They Serve Beer in Hell is a 2009 American independent comedy film loosely based on the work and persona of writer Tucker Max, who co-wrote the screenplay. In an interview with Shave Magazine Max explained that the film is not "a direct recount or retelling. It says it is based on true events because it is. Basically, every scene in the movie happened in real life in one way or another but it happened in a different time or time frame. But pretty much every single thing happened." The film was directed by Bob Gosse and stars Matt Czuchry as Max. It was produced by Darko Entertainment and distributed by Freestyle Releasing. Max had said previously that sequels were possible if the initial film found financial success.

The film was released in theaters on September 25, 2009. The DVD was released on January 26, 2010. While the book was a best-seller, the film adaptation of Max's exploits was a box office bomb that earned overwhelmingly negative reviews.

Plot summary

The film's plot is loosely adapted from "The Austin Road Trip Story" in Max's book I Hope They Serve Beer in Hell.  A tireless and charismatic novelty seeker, Tucker (Matt Czuchry) tricks his buddy Dan (Geoff Stults) into lying to his fiancée Kristy (Keri Lynn Pratt), so they can go to a legendary strip club three and a half hours away to celebrate Dan's last days of bachelorhood in proper style. Tucker drags their misanthropic friend Drew (Jesse Bradford) along for the ride, and before they know it Tucker's pursuit of a hilarious carnal interest lands Dan in serious trouble with both the law and his future wife.

The ensuing blowout leaves Tucker uninvited from the wedding and ankle-deep in a mess of his own creation. If he wants back into the wedding and the lives of his best friends, he'll have to find a way to balance the demands of friendship with his own narcissism and selfishness.

Principal cast
 Matt Czuchry as Tucker Max
 Jesse Bradford as Drew
 Geoff Stults as Dan
 Keri Lynn Pratt as Kristy
 Marika Dominczyk as Lara
 Nicole Muirbrook as Christina
 Traci Lords as Connie
 Paul Wall as Grillionaire
 Derek Wayne Johnson as Friend #2
 Melissa Fumero as Melissa

Denise Quiñones was originally cast as Lara, but dropped out two days before filming started. Dominczyk, who had been the original first choice for the role but had passed due to a scheduling conflict, was now available and stepped in immediately

The film includes cameo appearances from UFC fighters Forrest Griffin and Mac Danzig; rapper Paul Wall; Fark.com founder Drew Curtis, author Timothy Ferriss, and the real-life Tucker Max (playing Dan's older brother Jeff). Producer/writer Nils Parker also has a small cameo, playing an announcer in the strip club.

Reception
The film received generally negative reviews. , 20% of the 35 reviews compiled on Rotten Tomatoes are positive, with an average rating of 3.19/10. The review consensus from Rotten Tomatoes was: "I Hope They Serve Beer in Hell fails in its attempts at raunchy humor, and Tucker Max comes across so unlikable and outrageous that the film's inevitable story arc feels forced."  Numerous critics considered the movie to be one of the worst of the year.

Box office
Opening weekend gross was $366,900 on 120 screens. Its total domestic gross was $1.4 million. Max blamed the movie's box office failure on the marketing of the movie.

In 2016, Max described the movie as "a big failure, probably my biggest and most personal ever", and blamed himself:

Controversy
In 2009, during the pre-release promotional period for the movie, several publications accused Max of rape and of promoting rape culture by allegedly glamorizing the practice of engaging in sex acts with women who are intoxicated. In addition, protests were staged at screenings of the movie by demonstrators who argued that intoxication precludes a woman from consenting to sex, and thus Max's stories and movie include descriptions of acts that "meet the legal definition of rape in North Carolina." In 2012, writing in his book Trust Me, I'm Lying, Max's marketer Ryan Holiday claimed that the controversy was a publicity stunt fabricated and spread by Holiday to create interest in the film.

References

External links

2009 films
2009 comedy films
Films based on short fiction
Films directed by Bob Gosse
Films scored by James L. Venable
American comedy films
2000s English-language films
2000s American films